Skybombers is a rock band from Melbourne. They were formed as Collusion by Scotch College students Hugh Gurney, Ravi Sharma, Scott McMurtrie and Sam Bethune. They later changed to Skybombers, a name inspired by an icy-pole. Their placing a demo song "It Goes Off" on MySpace brought them their first TV appearances. They had early international attention when "It Goes Off" of their EP Sirens made the most-played list on L.A.'s Indie 103.1 and played a showcase gig at The Viper Room. They have toured Australia, Japan and USA. and their debut album Take Me To Town was recorded in L.A. with Rick Parker (Black Rebel Motorcycle Club). The band made their way on video game media in 2007 when "It Goes Off" appeared on the soundtrack for Burnout Dominator, the song later reappeared on Burnout Paradise in early 2008. Black Carousel was recorded in LA, again with Rick Parker at the helm.

Discography

Albums

Extended plays

Singles

References

External links
[ allmusic bio]

Victoria (Australia) musical groups